Pyramid Mountain is a 2,395-foot (730-meter) elevation mountain summit located on Kodiak Island in the US state of Alaska. Although modest in elevation, relief is significant since the peak rises over 2,300 feet above Buskin Lake in only . This peak's descriptive name was first published in 1943 by the United States Coast and Geodetic Survey. Based on the Köppen climate classification, Pyramid Mountain is located in a subpolar oceanic climate zone with cold winters and cool summers. Summer months offer the most favorable weather for climbing the peak via an established two-mile trail.

See also
 
List of mountain peaks of Alaska
Geography of Alaska

References

External links
 Weather forecast: Pyramid Mountain

Mountains of Alaska
Mountains of Kodiak Island Borough, Alaska